Cantigny is a  park in Wheaton, Illinois, 30 miles west of Chicago. It is the former estate of Joseph Medill and his grandson Colonel Robert R. McCormick, publishers of the Chicago Tribune, and is open to the public. Cantigny includes large formal and informal gardens, two museums, a 27-hole golf course, a picnic grove, a playground, hiking paths, restaurants and a gift shop.

Origins
The land was acquired by Joseph Medill as a country estate, which he called Red Oaks, in the late 1800s. After his death, the estate passed to his grandson, Colonel McCormick. Colonel McCormick served in World War I and saw action at the Battle of Cantigny. After returning home, he renamed the estate in honor of the battle.

Colonel McCormick had no children. When he died in 1955, he left his fortune to establish the McCormick Charitable Trust (now the McCormick Foundation). He also directed that Cantigny should be transformed into a park for the use of the general public. Since then, the McCormick Foundation has used the endowment funds bequeathed by Colonel McCormick to operate Cantigny as a public facility.

Robert R. McCormick Museum
In 1896–1897, Joseph Medill built a 35-room mansion on the estate; it was designed by architect Charles Allerton Coolidge. Today the mansion is the Robert R. McCormick Museum, a historic house museum which is open to the public for tours.

First Division Museum
During World War I, Colonel McCormick served with the First Division of the United States Army—also known as the "Big Red One". Colonel McCormick provided an endowment for the First Division Museum, which was designed by architect Andrew Rebori. The museum has exhibits and artifacts chronicling the First Division's service history, not only in World War I, but also in World War II and later U.S. wars.

On display outside the museum is the area's largest collection of tanks and artillery pieces, known as "Tank Park".  The collection includes tanks and armored vehicles from the First World War up to the present day.  Visitors are allowed to climb on the vehicles.

The museum's "Date with History" series features guest speakers on subjects of interest to the general public and military historians in particular.  Speakers include historians, authors, filmmakers and veterans.  The presentations are generally open to the public and free of charge.

The museum is also home to the McCormick Research Center, for use by authors, scholars, teachers and students.  The center's archives contain more than 10,000 works on military history, including secondary works on various battles, campaigns and wars.  Included in the primary works are the bound battle records of the First Division in World War I, and the 1st Infantry Division's World War II battle records on microfilm.  The center's Reading Room is open to the public.

Public park
Cantigny Park is open to the public and attracts more than 350,000 people per year. Visitors can watch a short welcome film inside the visitor center to learn about the park's history and present-day features. The visitor center also includes the Cantigny Shop, Bertie's coffee shop and Le Jardin, a sit-down restaurant serving lunch.

Concerts, lectures, workshops, festivals and other events are held at Cantigny throughout the year. It is also a common place for weddings and banquets. School field trips and youth group camping are also offered at Cantigny.

The Cantigny estate includes ornamental landscapes and gardens covering about 30 acres. Its features include the Rose Garden and the one-acre Idea Garden, designed to educate and inspire home gardeners. The original design of the gardens was the work of German-American landscape architect Franz Lipp. Cantigny's horticulture department offers a number of programs throughout the year, including floral workshops, gardening lectures, free tours and monthly bird walks.

Colonel McCormick and his first wife, Amy, are buried on the grounds. The elaborate gravesite, near the mansion, is known as the Exedra and was designed by Chicago architect Andrew Rebori.

Golf

Cantigny Golf Club, owned by the Chicago-based Robert R. McCormick Foundation and managed by KemperSports (Northbrook, Ill.), celebrated 25 years in 2014.  When it opened in 1989, Golf Digest named Cantigny the “Best New Public Course in America.”  Cantigny hosted the 2007 U.S. Amateur Public Links Championship, four Illinois State Amateur Championships (most recently in 2014) and the Chicago Open in 2013 and 2014. The 300-acre Cantigny Golf complex includes 27 holes designed by Roger Packard, the year-round Cantigny Golf Academy, the 9-hole Cantigny Youth Links and a clubhouse with dining and banquet facilities.

Film
The McCormick Museum was used for filming a scene in A League of Their Own (1992) from the east end overlooking the fountain and pond east of the museum. Two other movies, Richie Rich and Baby's Day Out also include scenes from outside the mansion.

Location
Cantigny Park is located in Wheaton, Illinois, at 1s151 Winfield Road, south of Illinois Route 38 (Roosevelt Road). The entrance to Cantigny Golf is 27w270 Mack Road, also in Wheaton.

References

Further reading
 Marsh, Hannah. "Memory in World War I American museum exhibits" (MA thesis, Kansas State University, 2015, online)

External links
Cantigny Park
First Division Museum at Cantigny Park
Cantigny Golf
McCormick Foundation
Cantigny First Division Oral Histories in Ball State University Libraries' Digital Media Repository

Golf clubs and courses in Illinois
Wheaton, Illinois
Protected areas of DuPage County, Illinois
Parks in Illinois
Military and war museums in Illinois
1955 establishments in Illinois
McCormick family